Between the Earth and the Stars is the seventeenth studio album by Welsh singer Bonnie Tyler, released on 15 March 2019 by earMUSIC. The album was produced by David Mackay.

Background 
In October 2014, Tyler was misquoted in an interview with the Daily Sabah stating that she had begun working on her seventeenth studio album with Jim Steinman, saying, "We are choosing love songs and Jim’s melodies are amazing, we have already chosen some great rock pieces." The quotes were later removed from the original article.

Following the release of Rocks and Honey in 2013, Tyler remarked to Portugal's Kiss FM that she expected it to be her last. In 2017, she announced that she had been inspired to record another album after hearing "fantastic new songs" written for her by Kevin Dunne, who played bass guitar in her first band in the early 1970s. In December 2016, she visited the Cash Cabin Studios in Nashville to commence recording with John Carter Cash. In 2018, Tyler announced that she would instead be working with David Mackay, who co-produced her first two albums, The World Starts Tonight (1977) and Natural Force (1978). Tyler and Mackay also collaborated on Frankie Miller's album Double Take (2016).

In August 2018, The Sun falsely reported that Tyler had recorded an album of duets with Rod Stewart. Tyler clarified in another interview with Kiss FM that they had only recorded one song, later revealing the title to be "Battle of the Sexes".

The title track "Between the Earth and the Stars" was originally recorded by American singer Jeff Wood on his 1997 album of the same name. "Don't Push Your Luck" originally appeared on Lorraine Crosby's album Mrs Loud (2008). "Slow Walk" first appeared on Brian Cadd's album Bulletproof (2016). "Someone's Rockin' Your Heart", the album's duet with Francis Rossi of Status Quo, was originally written by Rossi and Bob Young for Status Quo's 2016 album Aquostic II: That's a Fact!, under the alternate title "Is Someone Rocking Your Heart?".

Artwork and packaging 
The cover art for Between the Earth and the Stars is cropped from a photograph by Tina Korhonen. The album's title is visually represented by a circle and two stars, which appear between the text of Tyler's name and the album title.

Promotion
Tyler announced that she had reunited with David Mackay on Jane McDonald and Friends in March 2018. In October, Tyler appeared on Good Morning America. She performed at the Brandenburg Gate in Berlin on 31 December 2018 to promote her new album and upcoming tour. On 22 January, Tyler's website closed, leaving a notice that read: "Check back for an exciting announcement on 31 January 2019!" Her website reopened the following day with a new design, featuring a short video documentary with previews of selected tracks and interviews with Tyler and Mackay.

Singles
On 1 February 2019, "Hold On" was released as the first single from Between the Earth and the Stars.

Tour
On 28 October 2018, Tyler announced that she would be embarking on a European tour in support of Between the Earth and the Stars. The tour will begin on 28 April 2019 at the Circus Krone in Munich, Germany, and will conclude on 1 June 2019 at the W-Festival in Frankfurt, Germany, with a total of 23 dates in venues throughout Germany, Belgium, the Netherlands, Switzerland, Luxembourg, France and Austria.

Track listing

Charts

Release history

References

2019 albums
Bonnie Tyler albums
Albums produced by David Mackay (producer)